Brick Township is a township in Ocean County, in the U.S. state of New Jersey. As of the 2020 United States census, the city retained its position as the state's 13th-most-populous municipality, with a population of 73,620, a decrease of 1,452 (−1.9%) from the 2010 census count of 75,072, which in turn reflected a decline of 1,047 residents (−1.4%) from its population of 76,119 in the 2000 Census, when it was the state's 12th most-populous municipality.

A majority of Brick Township is located on the mainland. Ocean Beaches I, II, and III are situated on the Barnegat Peninsula, a long, narrow barrier peninsula that separates Barnegat Bay from the Atlantic Ocean. The mainland and beach area of the town are not geographically adjacent. Brick Township was incorporated as a township by an act of the New Jersey Legislature on February 15, 1850, from portions of both Dover Township (now Toms River Township) and Howell Township. The township was named after Joseph Brick, the owner of Bergen Iron Works located on the Metedeconk River. Portions of the township were taken to form Point Pleasant Beach (May 18, 1886), Bay Head (June 15, 1886), Lakewood Township (March 23, 1892), Mantoloking (April 10, 1911) and Point Pleasant (April 21, 1920). In 1963, voters rejected a referendum that would have changed the township's name to "Laurelton".

The Havens Homestead Museum is dedicated to the Havens family that originally settled in the Laurelton/Burrsville section of Brick. The museum is the original Havens home which lies on a small plot of farmland. The museum has a gift shop and runs tours of the property daily.

After hovering for years in the top five, in 2006, the township earned the title of "America's Safest City", out of 371 cities included nationwide in the 13th annual Morgan Quitno survey. Since the year 2000, Brick Township has been the safest "city" (population over 75,000) in New Jersey. In 2003 and 2004, Brick Township was ranked as the second safest city in the United States, after Newton, Massachusetts. In 2005, Brick Township had dropped down to the fifth safest "city" (population over 75,000) in the United States, before it rebounded to the top in 2006.

Brick Township has also been in the news for a claimed autism epidemic, in which 40 children out of over 6,000 surveyed were found to be autistic, though Brick's autism rate is statistically near the national average. Many of the children found to be autistic were born in Northern New Jersey and other parts of the country. There is no evidence that the levels of autism are linked to any specific environmental factor in Brick. Parents of children diagnosed with autism have moved to the township in order to make use of the special education programs offered by the school district.

Brick has been affected by the heroin epidemic. According to the state's statistics, in 2012 Brick was ranked sixth in the state with 550 reported incidents of heroin or opiate abuse, behind Newark, Jersey City, Paterson, Atlantic City and Camden. In 2017, Brick improved to 438 reported heroin abuse cases, ranked ninth in the state.

On July 11, 2004, Brick Memorial High School student, Brittney Gregory went missing.  The news of her disappearance went on national news.  Her body was found in a shallow grave, after a woman led the police to the area, just off.  Suspect Jack Fuller Jr., a drug addict and acquaintance to Gregory’s father admitted to killing Gregory.  Fuller stated that he was giving her a ride to her boyfriend’s house.  Fuller began smoking crack in the car and Gregory became upset.  Fuller punched Gregory several times and when she died, he buried her. 

During the December 2010 North American blizzard, Brick Township received  of snow, the highest accumulation recorded in the state. In October 2012, parts of Brick were devastated by Hurricane Sandy. Barrier island and other waterfront properties were particularly hard hit. Homes and such buildings as the Shore Acres Yacht Club sustained major damage; some buildings had to be demolished.

Geography
According to the U.S. Census Bureau, the township had a total area of 32.22 square miles (83.44 km2), including 25.61 square miles (66.34 km2) of land and 6.61 square miles (17.11 km2) of water (20.50%).

Unincorporated communities, localities and place names located partially or completely within the township include Adamston, Arrowhead Village, Breton Woods, Burrsville, Cedar Bridge, CedarCroft, Cedarwood Park, Cherry Quay, Greenbriar, Havens Cove, Havens Point, Herbertsville, Herring Island, Lanes Mills, Laurelton, Mandalay Park, Metedeconk, Metedeconk Neck, Osbornville, Playground Beach, Riviera Beach, Seaweed Point, Shore Acres, Sloop Point, Swan Point, Wardell's Neck, West Mantoloking and West Osbornville.

The communities of Herbertsville and Parkway Pines are located close to exit 91 of the Garden State Parkway, near the Monmouth County border, and are geographically distant from the rest of the township. Bayberry Court and Maypink Lane are two streets that are not accessible from any other Brick roads, and are served by the United States Postal Service as ZIP Code 07731 with Howell Township.

The township borders Bay Head, Lakewood Township, Mantoloking, Point Pleasant and Toms River Township in Ocean County; and the Monmouth County municipalities of Brielle, Howell Township and Wall Township.

Demographics

2010 census

The Census Bureau's 2006-2010 American Community Survey showed that (in 2010 inflation-adjusted dollars) median household income was $65,129 (with a margin of error of +/− $2,969) and the median family income was $81,868 (+/− $2,081). Males had a median income of $60,769 (+/− $1,755) versus $41,361 (+/− $1,655) for females. The per capita income for the township was $33,258 (+/− $891). About 4.1% of families and 5.2% of the population were below the poverty line, including 8.1% of those under age 18 and 5.9% of those age 65 or over.

2000 census
As of the 2000 U.S. census, there were 76,119 people, 29,511 households, and 20,775 families residing in the township. The racial makeup of the township was 95.81% White, 0.99% African American, 0.10% Native American, 1.19% Asian, 0.02% Pacific Islander, 0.85% from other races, and 1.04% from two or more races. Hispanic or Latino of any nationality were 3.85% of the population.

There were 29,511 households, out of which 31.6% had children under the age of 18 living with them, 56.8% were married couples living together, 10.2% had a female householder with no husband present, and 29.6% were non-families. Of all households, 25.0% were made up of individuals, and 12.7% had someone living alone who was 65 years of age or older.  The average household size was 2.56 and the average family size was 3.07.

In the township, the population was spread out, with 23.8% under the age of 18, 6.4% from 18 to 24, 29.5% from 25 to 44, 23.3% from 45 to 64, and 17.0% who were 65 years of age or older.  The median age was 39 years. For every 100 females, there were 90.5 males.  For every 100 females age 18 and over, there were 86.8 males.

The median income for a household in the township was $52,092, and the median income for a family was $61,446. Males had a median income of $44,981 versus $31,020 for females. The per capita income for the township was $24,462.  About 3.1% of families and 4.5% of the population were below the poverty line, including 5.8% of those under age 18 and 5.0% of those age 65 or over.

Sports
The Brick Pop Warner Little Scholars Mustangs finished the 2006 season with a perfect 9–0 record and won the Jersey Shore B Division.

In 2003, and from 2006 to 2009, the Pop Warner Brick Mustang cheerleaders competed against other teams from across the nation in Disney World. In 2003, the junior peewee Mustang cheer squad won the national title.

Brick is home of the Ocean Ice Palace, built in 1960, which hosts the Brick Hockey Club. The ice rink is also home to the Brick Stars, a special needs hockey team who has home games and practices.

Parks and recreation
Fishing is permitted on the reservoir. The township also maintains nearly a dozen community parks, a multi-sports facility at the Drum Point Sports Complex and three oceanfront beaches as well as Windward Beach Park on the Metedeconk River.

Government

Local government
The township operates within the Faulkner Act (formally known as the Optional Municipal Charter Law) under the Mayor-Council plan 2 form of government, as implemented on January 1, 1990, based on direct petition. The township is one of 71 municipalities (of the 564) statewide that use this form of government. The governing body is comprised of the Mayor and the seven-member Township Council, whose members are elected to serve four-year terms of office, with either three seats (and the mayoral seat) or four seats up for election at-large in partisan elections held on a staggered basis in odd-numbered years as part of the November general election. The mayor is elected for a four-year term without limitation as to the number of terms. In November 1988, the voters approved a referendum which returned the township to the partisan system of government, with township elections held as part of the November general election (rather than in May).

The mayor is the township's chief executive and administrative officer and is responsible for administering local laws and policy development. The mayor makes various appointments, prepares the township's budget, and approves or vetoes ordinances adopted by the Township Council (which may be overridden by a ⅔ vote of the Township Council). The mayor appoints, with the advice and consent of the Township Council, the business administrator, the township attorney, and the directors of the Departments of Public Safety, Engineering and Public Works.

, the mayor of Brick Township is Democrat John G. Ducey, whose term of office ends on December 31, 2025. Members of the Township Council are Council President Vincent Minichino (D, 2023), Council Vice President Lisa Crate (D, 2023), Perry Albanese (R, 2025), Arthur Halloran (D, 2023), Heather deJong (D, 2025), Marianna Pontoriero (D, 2025) and Andrea Zapcic (D, 2023).

In January 2014, the Township Council appointed Andrea Zapcic to fill the vacant council seat expiring in December 2015 of John G. Ducey after he took office as mayor. Zapcic won election in November 2014 to serve the balance of the term.

Ducey was elected as mayor in 2013, garnering 62% of the vote to defeat Republican opponent Joseph Sangiovanni.

Former Democratic Mayor Joseph C. Scarpelli resigned as of December 8, 2006, amid a federal corruption probe into township government. On January 8, 2007, Scarpelli pleaded guilty to federal bribery charges for accepting money from developers in exchange for using his official position to obtain approval for development projects.  Township Clerk Virginia Lampman was appointed to fill the role of mayor until the Township Council could select a replacement. On December 17, 2007, former Scarpelli was sentenced in Federal Court in Newark to serve 18 months in prison and was fined $5,000, after admitting that he had accepted bribes from 1998 to 2003.

On January 4, 2007, Daniel J. Kelly (D), the Township's Planning Board chairman, was appointed the new mayor by a three-member township council subcommittee. On November 6, 2007, Stephen C. Acropolis defeated Kelly in a race to fill the remaining two years of Scarpelli's term.

Federal, state, and county representation
Brick Township is located in the 4th Congressional District and is part of New Jersey's 10th state legislative district. 

 

Ocean County is governed by a Board of County Commissioners comprised of five members who are elected on an at-large basis in partisan elections and serving staggered three-year terms of office, with either one or two seats coming up for election each year as part of the November general election. At an annual reorganization held in the beginning of January, the board chooses a Director and a Deputy Director from among its members. , Ocean County's Commissioners (with party affiliation, term-end year and residence) are:

Commissioner Director John P. Kelly (R, 2022, Eagleswood Township),
Commissioner Deputy Director Virginia E. Haines (R, 2022, Toms River),
Barbara Jo Crea (R, 2024, Little Egg Harbor Township)
Gary Quinn (R, 2024, Lacey Township) and
Joseph H. Vicari (R, 2023, Toms River). Constitutional officers elected on a countywide basis are 
County Clerk Scott M. Colabella (R, 2025, Barnegat Light),
Sheriff Michael G. Mastronardy (R, 2022; Toms River) and
Surrogate Jeffrey Moran (R, 2023, Beachwood).

Politics
As of March 2011, there were a total of 48,760 registered voters in Brick Township, of which 9,992 (20.5%) were registered as Democrats, 12,206 (25.0%) were registered as Republicans and 26,528 (54.4%) were registered as Unaffiliated. There were 34 voters registered to other parties. Among the township's 2010 Census population, 65.0% (vs. 63.2% in Ocean County) were registered to vote, including 81.9% of those ages 18 and over (vs. 82.6% countywide).

In the 2012 presidential election, Republican Mitt Romney received 55.9% of the vote (18,484 cast), ahead of Democrat Barack Obama with 42.9% (14,184 votes), and other candidates with 1.2% (387 votes), among the 33,328 ballots cast by the township's 51,117 registered voters (273 ballots were spoiled), for a turnout of 65.2%. In the 2008 presidential election, Republican John McCain received 58.1% of the vote (21,912 cast), ahead of Democrat Barack Obama with 39.9% (15,031 votes) and other candidates with 1.3% (489 votes), among the 37,704 ballots cast by the township's 50,742 registered voters, for a turnout of 74.3%. In the 2004 presidential election, Republican George W. Bush received 60.9% of the vote (21,888 ballots cast), outpolling Democrat John Kerry with 37.8% (13,596 votes) and other candidates with 0.8% (363 votes), among the 35,954 ballots cast by the township's 48,235 registered voters, for a turnout percentage of 74.5.

In the 2013 gubernatorial election, Republican Chris Christie received 74.4% of the vote (17,331 cast), ahead of Democrat Barbara Buono with 24.2% (5,633 votes), and other candidates with 1.4% (332 votes), among the 23,830 ballots cast by the township's 50,398 registered voters (534 ballots were spoiled), for a turnout of 47.3%. In the 2009 gubernatorial election, Republican Chris Christie received 67.3% of the vote (17,822 ballots cast), ahead of Democrat Jon Corzine with 25.2% (6,675 votes), Independent Chris Daggett with 5.0% (1,336 votes) and other candidates with 1.0% (272 votes), among the 26,479 ballots cast by the township's 49,529 registered voters, yielding a 53.5% turnout.

Education
The Brick Public Schools serve students in pre-kindergarten through twelfth grade. As of the 2020–21 school year, the district, comprised of 12 schools, had an enrollment of 8,414 students and 689.1 classroom teachers (on an FTE basis), for a student–teacher ratio of 12.2:1. Schools in the district (with 2020–21 enrollment data from the National Center for Education Statistics) are 
Herbertsville Preschool (147; PreK), 
Warren H. Wolf Preschool (277; PreK; created for 2014-15 school year from Primary Learning Center), 
Drum Point Elementary School (479; K-5), 
Lanes Mill Elementary School (560; K-5), 
Midstreams Elementary School (548; K-5), 
Osborneville Elementary School (402; K-5), 
Veterans Memorial Elementary School (647; K-5), 
Emma Havens Young Elementary School (732; K-5), 
Lake Riviera Middle School (861; 6-8), 
Veterans Memorial Middle School (965; 6-8), 
Brick Memorial High School (1,410; 9-12) and 
Brick Township High School (1,314; 9-12).

Nonsectarian private schools include Cuddle Care Early Childhood Center and Ocean Early Childhood Center. St. Dominic Elementary School is a Roman Catholic private school overseen by the Roman Catholic Diocese of Trenton, and St. Paul's Christian School, a Methodist private school, serve students in nursery through eighth grade.

Transportation

Roads and highways

The Garden State Parkway is the most prominent highway passing through Brick. It traverses the western part of the municipality with three interchanges: Exits 91, 90, and 89. Three state routes also pass through: Route 70 Route 88, and Route 35. The major county routes that pass through are CR 528, and CR 549 (as well as its spur).

The Laurelton Circle was located near the center of Brick Township. The traffic circle was at the junction of Route 70, Route 88 and Princeton Avenue.  It was converted to a traffic light regulated intersection in 1986, due to an increase in traffic and accidents.  To reduce the need for left turns, a short portion of eastbound Route 88 was re-routed onto Princeton Avenue. Some other movements are controlled by jughandles and a two-way connection in the northwest corner.

Public transportation 
NJ Transit offers bus service between the township and the Port Authority Bus Terminal in Midtown Manhattan on the 137 route, to Camden on the 317 and to Newark on the 67. Bus service is available from the Garden State Parkway to the Financial District in Lower Manhattan via the Academy Bus Line. Brick Township Park & Ride is located in the township off of the Garden State Parkway at exit 91. It is an express route to New York City during peak rush-hour. Ocean Ride service is provided on route 3, 3A and 4.

Media

WBGD 91.9FM (Brick Green Dragons) went on the air in 1974, originally located at Brick Township High School.  The station was later moved to Brick Memorial High School. The radio station was the brainchild of a teacher named Robert Boesch who taught electronics at Brick Township High School in the 1960s, 1970s and 1980s. The station was a student-run operation and received its FCC license from the FCC for Educational Broadcasting.

One of the most notable broadcasts was the first ever state high school football championship game played between Brick Township High School and Camden High School in December 1974.  The Brick Green Dragons defeated Camden by a score of 21–20 on the last play of the game to win the title.

In 2007, during routine roof maintenance and repair work, the broadcast tower was cut off the roof, and was never replaced or repaired. In 2010 WBGD's license was retired.

The Asbury Park Press provides daily news coverage of the township, as does WOBM-FM radio. The government of the township provides material and commentary to The Brick Times, which is one of seven weekly papers from Micromedia Publications.

Climate

According to the Köppen climate classification system, Brick Township, New Jersey has a humid subtropical climate (Cfa). Cfa climates are characterized by all months having an average mean temperature > 32.0 °F (> 0.0 °C), at least four months with an average mean temperature ≥ 50.0 °F (≥ 10.0 °C), at least one month with an average mean temperature ≥ 71.6 °F (≥ 22.0 °C) and no significant precipitation difference between seasons. During the summer months in Brick Township, a cooling afternoon sea breeze is present on most days, but episodes of extreme heat and humidity can occur with heat index values ≥ 95 °F (≥ 35 °C). On average, the wettest month of the year is July which corresponds with the annual peak in thunderstorm activity. During the winter months, episodes of extreme cold and wind can occur with wind chill values < 0 °F (< −18 °C). The plant hardiness zone at Brick Township Beach is 7a with an average annual extreme minimum air temperature of 3.4 °F (−15.9 °C).

Ecology

According to the A. W. Kuchler U.S. potential natural vegetation types, Brick Township, New Jersey would have two classifications; 1) a dominant vegetation type of Northeastern Oak/Pine (110) with a dominant vegetation form of Southern Mixed Forest (26) just inland from the bays and rivers, and 2) a dominant vegetation type of Northern Cordgrass (73) with a dominant vegetation form of Coastal Prairie (20) on the barrier island and near the bays and rivers.

Notable people

People who were born in, residents of, or otherwise closely associated with Brick Township include:

 Joe Acanfora (born 1950), educator and activist who fought to teach earth science in public schools in the early 1970s but was dismissed based upon his acknowledged homosexuality
 Jay Alders (born 1973),  fine artist, photographer and graphic designer, who is best known for his original surf art paintings
 Harry Bernstein (1910–2011), author of The Invisible Wall
 Hank Borowy (1916–2004), Major League Baseball All-Star pitcher who played for the New York Yankees, Chicago Cubs, Philadelphia Phillies, Pittsburgh Pirates and Detroit Tigers. He lived the majority of his life in Brick Township and died there at age 88
 John Catalano (born 1949), politician who has served in the New Jersey General Assembly since 2020, where he represents the 10th Legislative District
 Nick Catone (born 1981), mixed martial artist who participates in the Ultimate Fighting Championships
 Andrew R. Ciesla (born 1953), politician who served in the New Jersey Senate from 1992 to 2012, where he represented the 10th Legislative District
 Jim Dowd, (born 1968), former player in the National Hockey League (NHL), won a Stanley Cup with the 1994-95 New Jersey Devils and last played for the Philadelphia Flyers
 John Paul Doyle (born 1942), politician who served as majority leader of the New Jersey General Assembly
 Kirsten Dunst (born 1982), actress, grew up in the township before relocating to California
 Garrett Graham (born 1986), NFL tight end who plays for the Houston Texans
 Jack Martin (1887–1980), Major League Baseball infielder who played for the 1912 New York Yankees (Highlanders), 1914 Philadelphia Phillies and Boston Braves, who lived out his twilight years in Brick Township and is the namesake of Jack Martin Boulevard
 Tom McCarthy (born 1968), television announcer for the Philadelphia Phillies
 Gregory P. McGuckin (born 1961), politician who has represented the 10th Legislative District in the New Jersey General Assembly since 2012
 Melanie McGuire (born 1972), murderess convicted of killing and dismembering her husband
 Eli Mintz (1904–1988), actor
 Daniel F. Newman (1935–2009), politician who served in the New Jersey General Assembly and as Mayor of Brick Township
 Nick Piantanida (1932–1966), amateur parachute jumper who reached  with his Strato Jump II balloon on February 2, 1966
 John Sadak (born 1979, class of 1996), television announcer for the Cincinnati Reds, radio/TV sports announcer with Westwood One radio, CBS Sports Network, the ESPN family of networks, Fox Sports 1 and the Triple-A affiliate of the New York Yankees, the Scranton/Wilkes-Barre RailRiders
 Betsy Sholl (born 1945), poet who was poet laureate of Maine from 2006 to 2011
 George Tardiff (1936–2012), football head coach at Benedictine College and Washburn University
 Ja'Sir Taylor (born 1999), American football cornerback for the Los Angeles Chargers of the National Football League
 Art Thoms (born 1947), NFL defensive tackle for the Oakland Raiders (1969–1975) and Philadelphia Eagles (1977)
 Scott Thomsen (born 1993), soccer player who plays as a defender for the Richmond Kickers in the United Soccer League
 George Wirth, singer-songwriter
 Warren Wolf (1927–2019), long-time football coach for Brick Township High School who served on the Brick council as freeholder and in the state assembly
 David W. Wolfe (born 1942), politician who represented the 10th Legislative District in the New Jersey General Assembly from 1992 until 2020

References

External links

Brick Township website
Bricktown Online – Community Information Portal
Brick Township Historical Society

 
1850 establishments in New Jersey
Faulkner Act (mayor–council)
Jersey Shore communities in Ocean County
Populated places established in 1850
Townships in Ocean County, New Jersey